Suboxides are a class of oxides wherein the electropositive element is in excess relative to the “normal” oxides.  When the electropositive element is a metal, the compounds are sometimes referred to as “metal-rich”.  Thus the normal oxide of caesium is Cs2O, which is described as a Cs+ salt of O2−.  A suboxide of caesium is Cs11O3, where the charge on Cs is clearly less than 1+, but the oxide is still described as O2−.  Suboxides typically feature extensive bonding between the electropositive element, often leading to clusters.

Examples of suboxides other than alkali metal derivatives:
 Boron suboxide, BO;
 Carbon suboxide, C3O2;
 Boron suboxide, B6O;
 Phosphorus suboxide, PO

Metal-containing suboxides
Suboxides are intermediates along the pathway that forms the normal oxide.  Suboxides are sometimes visible when certain metals are exposed to small amounts of O2:
22 Cs  +  3 O2  →  2 Cs11O3
4 Cs11O3  +  5 O2  →  22 Cs2O

Several suboxides of caesium and rubidium have been characterized by X-ray crystallography. As of 1997, the inventory includes the following Rb9O2, Rb6O, Cs11O3, Cs4O, Cs7O, Cs11O3Rb, Cs11O3Rb2, and Cs11O3Rb3.

Suboxides are generally colored compounds indicating a degree of electron delocalisation. Cs7O has a unit cell containing a Cs11O3 cluster and 10 Cs atoms. The cluster can be visualised as being composed of three face-sharing octahedra. In the picture below the caesium atoms are purple and the oxygen atoms are red. The Cs-Cs distance in the cluster is 376 pm, which is less than the Cs-Cs distance in the metal of 576 pm. Rb9O2 and Rb6O both contain the Rb9O2 cluster, which can be visualised as two face-sharing octahedra. Rb6O can be formulated as (Rb9O2)Rb3. The Rb-Rb distance in the cluster is 352 pm which is shorter than the Rb-Rb in the metal of 485 pm. It is suggested that caesium suboxides play a role in the Ag-O-Cs (S1) and multialkali Na-K-Sb-Cs photocathodes.

Carbon suboxide
The suboxide of carbon adopts an unremarkable structure.  As for related organic cumulenes (e.g. ketene), C3O2 obeys the octet rule.

Related compounds
Subnitrides are also known. For example, Na16Ba6N features a nitride-centered octahedral cluster of six barium atoms embedded in a matrix of sodium.

References